BS14 may refer to:
BS14, a BS postcode area for Bristol, England
Bonomi BS.14 Astore, a glider
BS-14 María Pita, a Spanish Maritime Safety and Rescue Society tugboat	
BS 14 Specification for Structural Steel for Marine Boilers, a British Standard
Omega BS-14 Falcon, a helicopter